The Pleasure of My Company is a 2003 novel by Steve Martin, which tells the story of the life of Daniel Pecan Cambridge, an introverted young man with obsessive-compulsive disorder. The novel revolves around Daniel, his obsessions, and his interactions with the world around his home in Santa Monica, California.

Characters

Daniel Pecan Cambridge is the book's protagonist. Daniel has obsessive-compulsive disorder, and thus acts out compulsive behaviors such as stepping over cracks in the sidewalk.

Elizabeth Warner is a real estate agent whom Daniel falls in love with from afar.

Zandy is a pharmacist at the local Rite Aid whom Daniel develops a crush on before he meets her.

Daniel's grandmother is a kind, wealthy woman who sends him letters and checks throughout the novel.

Philipa is an intelligent and attractive actress who lives upstairs from Daniel with her boyfriend Brian and her dog Tiger. She is one of Daniel's closest friends.

Brian is Philipa's athletic boyfriend. Daniel is indifferent to him at first, but eventually they become friends.

Clarissa a college student who is studying to become a psychologist. She meets with Daniel twice a week to evaluate him, but their relationship becomes more personal.

Other

Steve Martin stated in an interview with About.com that if The Pleasure of My Company is made into a film, he would like Ashton Kutcher to play Daniel.

2003 American novels

Novels about obsessive–compulsive disorder
Novels set in Santa Monica, California
Novels by Steve Martin
Hyperion Books books